Pennichuck Brook is one of the tributaries of the Merrimack River in New Hampshire in the United States. It passes through Nashua and Merrimack, New Hampshire and serves as the public water supply for greater Nashua.

Route description 
Pennichuck Brook begins at Silver Lake in Hollis. It flows northeast under NH 122 and into Dunklee Pond, then continues northeast into Pennichuck Pond, on the boundary between Hollis and Nashua. Leaving Pennichuck Pond, it becomes the boundary between Nashua and the town of Merrimack, flowing northeast under Amherst Street (NH 101A), then turning east and flowing into Holts Pond and Bowers Pond. While part of Bowers Pond, it is crossed by the Everett Turnpike. Past the outlet of Bowers Pond, the brook drops into Harris Pond and Supply Pond, then goes under the Daniel Webster Highway (U.S. Route 3) before it flows into the Merrimack River. All of these water bodies are dammed. The brook runs roughly parallel to the Nashua River from Pennichuck Pond to the brook's mouth in Nashua.

See also
List of rivers of New Hampshire

References

External links

Pennichuck Corporation

Tributaries of the Merrimack River
Rivers of Hillsborough County, New Hampshire
Rivers of New Hampshire
Nashua, New Hampshire